Padena-ye Sofla Rural District is a rural district (dehestan) in Padena District, Semirom County, Isfahan Province, Iran. At the 2006 census, its population was 5,616, in 1,316 families.  The rural district has 13 villages.

References 

Rural Districts of Isfahan Province
Semirom County